Birdsong was a 2010 adaptation of the novel of the same title by Sebastian Faulks. The text was written by Rachel Wagstaff and the premiere production was directed by Trevor Nunn. That production began previews at the Comedy Theatre in London on September 18, 2010, and opened on September 28, 2010. The West End stage production's cast included Ben Barnes as Stephen Wraysford, Genevieve O'Reilly as Isabelle, Nicholas Farrell as René Azaire, Iain Mitchell as Bérard, Lee Ross as Jack Firebrace and Zoe Waites as Jeanne. Other cast members included Owain Arthur, Billy Carter, Florence Hall, Paul Hawkyard, Gregg Lowe, Joe Coen, Jack Hawkins, James Staddon and Annabel Topham. The play closed on January 15, 2011. The play reopened January 31, 2018 with its last show being performed July 21, 2018.

2018 cast and crew
 Firebrace - Tim Treloar
 Stephen - Tom Kay
 Isabelle - Madeleine Knight
 Tipper - Alfie Browne-Sykes
 Berrard - Jeffrey Harmer
 Lisette - Olivia Bernstone
 Shaw - Simon Lloyd
 Azaire - Martin Carroll
 Jeanne - Liz Garland
 Marguerite - Alice Brittain
 Evans - Riley Carter
 Cartwright - James Findlay
 Director - Trevor Nunn
 Playwright - Rachel Wagstaff
 Designer - John Napier

References

2010 plays
Plays about World War I
Plays based on novels